Rose Hill is a historic mansion in Port Arthur, Texas. It was built in 1906 for Rome Hatch Woodworth, who served as the mayor of Rose Hill. It was listed on the National Register of Historic Places in 1979.

See also

National Register of Historic Places listings in Jefferson County, Texas
Recorded Texas Historic Landmarks in Jefferson County

References

External links
Rose Hill - Beaumont Convention & Visitors Bureau

Houses on the National Register of Historic Places in Texas
Neoclassical architecture in Texas
Houses completed in 1905
Houses in Jefferson County, Texas
Port Arthur, Texas
Museums in Jefferson County, Texas
Historic house museums in Texas
1905 establishments in Texas